Song of the Executioner may refer to:

 The Executioner's Song, a 1979 novel by Norman Mailer
 "Song of the Executioner" (Highlander), an episode of the American TV series